Lee Hoi-sang (born April 15, 1941) is a Hong Kong martial arts film actor and martial artist, known for his roles in The 36th Chamber of Shaolin (as Abbot Li Hai Sheng) (1978), Shaolin Challenges Ninja (1978), The Incredible Kung Fu Master (1979), The Young Master (1980), The Prodigal Son (1981), Project A (1983), Shaolin and Wu Tang (1983) and Disciples of the 36th Chamber (1985), alongside actors such as Jackie Chan, Gordon Liu, Sammo Hung, Yuen Biao and even Bolo Yeung.

Life 
Lee Hoi-sang is a master of Wing Chun Boxing. He served as a Martial arts instructor and an action movie actor (Debuting in British Hong Kong) since his early years. During the 70's and 80's he joined Asian Television producers with his real Kung Fu, therefore he often plays martial arts roles in Asian Tv Dramas, and also many other supporting roles. For some of his audience he was known as "King of Fighters".

Lee Hoi-sang was a disciple of Yip Man. The Wing Chun he inherited is an authentic one, and he has been teaching for many years.

Filmography

Film

Television

References

External links
 
 Lee Hoi-sang at Letterboxd
 Lee Hoi-sang at Hong Kong Cinemagic
 
 Lee Hoi-sang at notre Cinema
 Lee Hoi-sang at Flyx

1941 births
Hong Kong male film actors
Hong Kong male television actors
Living people
Wing Chun practitioners from Hong Kong